Launch Point Press is a small press publisher of lesbian literature based in Portland, Oregon.

History
Launch Point Press (LPP) is a lesbian-oriented press with the goal of publishing quality works by newer authors just “launching” their careers or by experienced authors “re-launching” their work. LPP is on the list of women's presses "dedicated either wholly or to a significant degree to publishing material written for, by, or about women. Many of them started during the 'second wave' of feminism."

Since the publication of its first title in 2017, the primary focus of LPP has been on lesbian fiction: lesbian romance, lesbian crime fiction, and lesbian speculative fiction/sci-fi/fantasy novels. A typical production year includes 8 - 10 trade paperback releases.

Effective January 1, 2023, the founder of the press, Lori L. Lake, sold it to new owners Jodi and Peggy Zeramby.  Lake is staying on as an author and consultant to the new owners.

Notable Authors
CA Farlow
Edith Zeitlberger
EJ Kindred
Jane Cuthbertson
Judy M. Kerr
Linda Vogt
Lori L. Lake
Michele L. Coffman
Reba Birmingham
Sandra de Helen
Sandra Leigh Gable
Sue Hardesty

Awards
LPP authors have won multiple Golden Crown Literary Society “Goldie” Awards, Rainbow Awards, and have been finalists for many honors including the Lambda Literary Award, the Goldies, and local honors in their individual states and communities.

References

External links
  Official Publisher Website
  Distribution and Sales: Bella Books
  Facebook Home of Launch Point Press
  Lambda Literary Review Page for LPP
  Overdrive

Recommended Online Reading
 The Lesbian Pulp Fiction That Saved Lives: How potboilers and pin-ups showed gay and bisexual women they were not alone by Natasha Frost (2020)
 The 100 Best Lesbian Fiction & Memoir Books Of All Time by The Team at Autostraddle (2012)
  Lesbian Pulp Novels Made Me Feel Normal by Jessica Xing (2020)

Book publishing companies based in Oregon
Feminism in Oregon
Feminist book publishing companies
Lesbian culture in Oregon
Lesbian feminist literature
Lesbian organizations in the United States
LGBT book publishing companies
Publishing companies established in 2014
Small press publishing companies